The Southern Indiana Railroad Freighthouse, located in Seymour, Indiana, has since January 2008 served as the Jackson County Visitor Center, for Jackson County, Indiana.  This freight house was placed on the National Register of Historic Places on June 22, 2003.

Three separate railroads once used the facilities here. These railroads included the Jeffersonville Railroad and the Ohio and Mississippi Line.  These facilities included a roundhouse repair shop, the Adams Express Company, and access to interurbans.  A passenger depot located next to the freighthouse has been demolished.  The Freighthouse has display detailing the history of railroads in Jackson County.

The Freighthouse is a block east of the Seymour Commercial Historic District.

References

External links
 Jackson County Visitor Center

National Register of Historic Places in Jackson County, Indiana
Railway freight houses on the National Register of Historic Places
Railway buildings and structures on the National Register of Historic Places in Indiana
Victorian architecture in Indiana
Buildings and structures completed in 1901
Buildings and structures in Jackson County, Indiana
Tourist attractions in Jackson County, Indiana